Rosemary Chukwuma (born 5 December 2001) is a Nigerian sprinter. She won a bronze medal in the  metres relay at the 2018 Commonwealth Games as well as a gold medal in the  metres relay at the 2019 African Games. In 2018, she won a gold medal in the 100 metres at the Summer Youth Olympics, clocking 11.17 seconds.

Career
Rosemary Chukwuma gained her first international experience at the 2018 Commonwealth Games in Gold Coast, Australia where she won a bronze medal behind the teams from England and Jamaica with the Nigerian  relay team in 42.75 seconds. In the summer she won a gold medal with the  relay team at the 2018 African Championships in Asaba but did not start over the 200 m event. Earlier, she won double gold at the 2018 African Youth Games in Algiers over 100 m and 200 m and thus qualified for the Summer Youth Olympics in Buenos Aires, where she won the 100 m gold medal.

In 2019, she won triple gold at the Junior African Championships in Abidjan with 11.62 seconds and 23.81 seconds finishes over 100 m and 200 m respectively, and in 45.56 seconds with the Nigerian  relay team. In early May, she ran in the  relay for Nigeria at the IAAF World Relays in Yokohama with 45.07 seconds in the first round. Then she took part in the African Games for the first time in Rabat and reached the final of the 200 m, where she did not start. She also won gold with the Nigerian relay team in 44.16 seconds.

References

External links

 

2001 births
Living people
Nigerian female sprinters
Athletes (track and field) at the 2018 Commonwealth Games
Athletes (track and field) at the 2018 Summer Youth Olympics
Athletes (track and field) at the 2018 African Youth Games
Athletes (track and field) at the 2019 African Games
African Games medalists in athletics (track and field)
African Games gold medalists for Nigeria
Commonwealth Games medallists in athletics
Commonwealth Games bronze medallists for Nigeria
Youth Olympic gold medalists for Nigeria
Youth Olympic gold medalists in athletics (track and field)
South Plains College alumni
People from Ebonyi State
21st-century Nigerian women
Athletes (track and field) at the 2022 Commonwealth Games
Medallists at the 2018 Commonwealth Games
Medallists at the 2022 Commonwealth Games